Generation is the second album of the Anarchic System released in 1975.

Track listing 

Side A:
 "Generation" — 19:15

Side B:
 "Nana Nana Guili Guili Gouzy Gouzy" — 2:55
 "1945" — 2:25
 "Good Morning Love" — 1:54
 "Wish to Know Why" — 2:32
 "So Is Life, Sad Is Life" — 2:35
 "Generation" (Short version) — 2:37

All songs from Paul de Senneville and Olivier Toussaint.
Except for Side B 3, from Ian Wira and Charles Gordanne.

Personnel 
 Side A, with orchestra directed by Hervé Roy
 Side B, first with orchestra directed by Raymond Donnez
 Side B, sixth song with orchestra directed by Hervé Roy
 Side B, other songs with orchestra directed by Charles Gordanne

Recording studios :
 Studio 92 : Side A and B1, B6 ;
 Studio Doc : Side A and B2-B5.

Distribution 
for France : Delphine Records, Distribution Discodis index catalog 700 005

Anarchic System albums
1975 albums